CRL may refer to:

Organisations

Science and technology research
 Chalk River Laboratories, a Canadian nuclear research center
 Charles River Laboratories, an American biomedical company 
 Computational Research Laboratories, an Indian computer company

Sports leagues
 California Rugby League, governing body for rugby league football in California and surrounding West Coast states in the US
 Canada Rugby League, the governing body for rugby league football in Canada
 Championship Racing League, a co-sanctioning arrangement between CART and USAC for the 1980 CART PPG Indy Car World Series
 Country Rugby League, governing body for rugby league football in rural New South Wales, Australia

Other organizations
 Canons Regular of the Lateran, a Catholic religious order
 Center for Research Libraries, a consortium of North American universities, colleges, and independent research libraries
 Co-operative Retail Logistics, part of the Co-operative Group
 Corsair International, formerly Corsairfly (ICAO airline designator)
 CRL Group, a British video game company

Science and technology

 Certificate revocation list, in computing, a list of revoked certificates
 Chemistry Research Laboratory, University of Oxford, the main chemistry building at Oxford University
 Complete Response Letter, the official FDA response to a New Drug Application
 Crown-rump length, the ultrasound measurement of a foetus

Transportation infrastructure
 Brussels South Charleroi Airport (IATA code CRL)
 Chicago Rail Link, a shortline railroad in Chicago
 City Rail Link, an under-construction rail project in Auckland, New Zealand
 Cross Island MRT line, a planned mass transit line for Singapore

Other uses
 East Cree language (ISO 639-3 code crl)
 Certified Registered Locksmith, as awarded by the Associated Locksmiths of America